The 1965 Oklahoma State Cowboys football team represented Oklahoma State University–Stillwater in the Big Eight Conference during the 1965 NCAA University Division football season. In their third season under head coach Phil Cutchin, the Cowboys compiled a 3–7 record (2–5 against conference opponents), tied for fifth place in the conference, and were outscored by opponents by a combined total of 173 to 131.

On offense, the 1965 team averaged 13.1 points scored, 159.4 rushing yards, and 78.5 passing yards per game.  On defense, the team allowed an average of 17.3 points scored, 202.5 rushing yards, and 104.4 passing yards per game. The team's statistical leaders included Walt Garrison with 924 rushing yards, Glenn Baxter with 574 passing yards, Tony Sellari with 226 receiving yards, and placekicker Charles Durkee with 37 points scored.

Running back Walt Garrison and guard Charles Harper were selected as a first-team All-Big Eight Conference player.

The team played its home games at Lewis Field in Stillwater, Oklahoma.

Schedule

After the season

The 1966 NFL Draft was held on November 27, 1965. The following Cowboys were selected.

References

Oklahoma State
Oklahoma State Cowboys football seasons
Oklahoma State Cowboys football